Matthew James Ford (born 19 April  1978) is an English professional golfer. Ford has played mostly on the Challenge Tour except for two seasons, 2015 and 2016, when he played on the European Tour.

Professional career
Ford qualified for the European Tour after finishing fourth in the 2014 European Tour qualifying school. He had a good start to 2015, finishing second in the Africa Open in March. He finished the season at 105th in the Order of Merit to retain his card for 2016. However he finished 131st in the Order of Merit in 2016 and returned to the Challenge Tour.

Except for his two season on the European Tour, Ford has played on the Challenge Tour since 2010. He has not won the tour but has been runner-up four times. In October 2020 he lost in a playoff for the Italian Challenge Open Eneos Motor Oil after Hurly Long made a birdie at the second extra hole. The following week he won the PGA Professional Championship at Trentham Golf Club with a score of 269, 19 under par, winning by 7 strokes.

Personal life
Ford is the son of former professional footballer and manager Andy Ford.

Professional wins (2)

PGA EuroPro Tour wins (1)

Other wins (1)
2020 PGA Professional Championship

Playoff record
Challenge Tour playoff record (0–1)

Results in major championships

See also
2014 European Tour Qualifying School graduates

References

External links

English male golfers
European Tour golfers
Sportspeople from Swindon
1978 births
Living people